Etymologiae (Latin for The Etymologies), also known as the Origines (Origins) and usually abbreviated Orig., is an etymological encyclopedia compiled by Isidore of Seville (c. 560–636), an influential Christian bishop, towards the end of his life. Isidore was encouraged to write the book by his friend Braulio, Bishop of Saragossa. The Etymologies summarized and organized a wealth of knowledge from hundreds of classical sources; three of its books are derived largely from Pliny the Elder's Natural History. Isidore acknowledges Pliny, but not his other principal sources, namely Cassiodorus, Servius, and Gaius Julius Solinus.

Etymologiae covers an encyclopedic range of topics. Etymology, the origins of words, is prominent, but the work also covers, among other things, grammar, rhetoric, mathematics, geometry, music, astronomy, medicine, law, the Roman Catholic Church and heretical sects, pagan philosophers, languages, cities, humans, animals, the physical world, geography, public buildings, roads, metals, rocks, agriculture, war, ships, clothes, food, and tools.

Etymologiae was widely used textbook throughout the Middle Ages. It was so popular that it was read in place of many of the original classical texts that it summarized; as a result, some of these ceased to be copied and were lost. It was cited by Dante Alighieri (who placed Isidore in his Paradiso), quoted by Geoffrey Chaucer, and mentioned by the poets Boccaccio, Petrarch, and John Gower. Etymologiae was printed in at least ten editions between 1472 and 1530, after which its importance faded during the Renaissance. The first scholarly edition was printed in Madrid in 1599; the first modern critical edition was edited by Wallace Lindsay in 1911.

Etymologiae is less well known in modern times, though modern scholars recognize its importance both in preserving classical texts and for insight into the medieval mindset.

Context

Isidore of Seville was born around 560 in Cartagena, Spain, under the unstable rule of the Visigoths after the collapse of the Roman Empire in the West.  His older brother, Leander, the abbot of a Seville monastery, supervised Isidore's education, probably in the school attached to his monastery. Leander was a powerful priest, a friend of Pope Gregory, and eventually he became bishop of Seville. Leander also made friends with the Visigothic king's sons, Hermenigild and Reccared. In 586, Reccared became king, and in 587 under Leander's religious direction he became a Catholic, controlling the choice of bishops. Reccared died in 601, not long after appointing Isidore as bishop of Seville.

Isidore helped to unify the kingdom through Christianity and education, eradicating the Arian heresy which had been widespread, and led National Councils at Toledo and Seville. Isidore had a close friendship with king Sisebut, who came to the throne in 612, and with another Seville churchman, Braulio, who later became bishop of Saragossa.

Isidore was widely read, mainly in Latin with a little Greek and Hebrew. He was familiar with the works of both the church fathers and pagan writers such as Martial, Cicero and Pliny the Elder, this last the author of the major encyclopaedia then in existence, the Natural History. The classical encyclopedists had already introduced alphabetic ordering of topics, and a literary rather than observational approach to knowledge: Isidore followed those traditions. Isidore became well known in his lifetime as a scholar. He started to put together a collection of his knowledge, the Etymologies, in about 600, and continued to write until about 625.

Overview

Etymologiae presents in abbreviated form much of that part of the learning of antiquity that Christians thought worth preserving. Etymologies, often very far-fetched, form the subject of just one of the encyclopedia's twenty books (Book X), but perceived linguistic similarities permeate the work. An idea of the quality of Isidore's etymological knowledge is given by Peter Jones: "Now we know most of his derivations are total nonsense (eg, he derives baculus, 'walking-stick', from Bacchus, god of drink, because you need one to walk straight after sinking a few)".

Isidore's vast encyclopedia of ancient learning includes subjects from theology to furniture, and provided a rich source of classical lore and learning for medieval writers. In his works including the Etymologiae, Isidore quotes from around 475 works from over 200 authors. Bishop Braulio, to whom Isidore dedicated it and sent it for correction, divided it into its twenty books.

An analysis by Jacques André of Book XII shows it contains 58 quotations from named authors and 293 borrowed but uncited usages: 79 from Solinus; 61 from Servius; 45 from Pliny the Elder. Isidore takes care to name classical and Christian scholars whose material he uses, especially, in descending order of frequency, Aristotle (15 references), Jerome (10 times), Cato (9 times), Plato (8 times), Pliny, Donatus, Eusebius, Augustine, Suetonius, and Josephus. He mentions as prolific authors the pagan Varro and the Christians Origen and Augustine. But his translator Stephen Barney notes as remarkable that he never actually names the compilers of the encyclopedias that he used "at second or third hand", Aulus Gellius, Nonius Marcellus, Lactantius, Macrobius, and Martianus Capella. Barney further notes as "most striking" that Isidore never mentions three out of his four principal sources (the one he does name being Pliny): Cassiodorus, Servius and Solinus. Conversely, he names Pythagoras eight times, even though Pythagoras wrote no books. The Etymologies are thus "complacently derivative".

In book II, dealing with dialectic and rhetoric, Isidore is heavily indebted to translations from the Greek by Boethius, and in book III, he is similarly in debt to Cassiodorus, who provided the gist of Isidore's treatment of arithmetic. Caelius Aurelianus contributes generously to the part of book IV dealing with medicine. Isidore's view of Roman law in book V is viewed through the lens of the Visigothic compendiary called the  Breviary of Alaric, which was based on the Code of Theodosius, which Isidore never saw. Through Isidore's condensed paraphrase a third-hand memory of Roman law passed to the Early Middle Ages. Lactantius is the author most extensively quoted in book XI, concerning man. Books XII, XIII and XIV are largely based on Pliny the Elder's Natural History and Solinus, whereas the lost Prata of Suetonius, which can be partly pieced together from what is quoted in Etymologiae, seems to have inspired the general plan of the work, as well as many of its details.

Isidore's Latin, replete with nonstandard Vulgar Latin, stands at the cusp of Latin and the local Romance language of Hispania. According to the prefatory letters, the work was composed at the urging of his friend Braulio, Bishop of Saragossa, to whom Isidore, at the end of his life, sent his codex inemendatus ("unedited book"), which seems to have begun circulating before Braulio was able to revise and issue it with a dedication to the late Visigothic King Sisebut.

Contents

The Etymologies organizes knowledge, mainly drawn from the classics, into twenty books:

In Book I, Isidore begins with a lengthy section on the first of three subjects in the mediaeval Trivium, considered at the time the core of essential knowledge, grammar. He covers the letters of the alphabet, parts of speech, accents, punctuation and other marks, shorthand and abbreviations, writing in cipher and sign language, types of mistake and histories. He derives the word for letters (littera) from the Latin words for "to read" (legere) and 'road' (iter), "as if the term were legitera", arguing that letters offer a road for people who read.

Book II completes the medieval Trivium with coverage of rhetoric and dialectic. Isidore describes what rhetoric is, kinds of argument, maxims, elocution, ways of speaking, and figures of speech. On dialectic, he discusses philosophy, syllogisms, and definitions. He equates the Greek term syllogism with the Latin term argumentation (argumentatio), which he derives from the Latin for "clear mind" (arguta mens).

Book III covers the medieval Quadrivium, the four subjects that supplemented the Trivium being arithmetic, geometry, music, and astronomy. He argues that there are infinitely many numbers, as you can always add one (or any other number) to whatever number you think is the limit. He attributes geometry to Ancient Egypt, arguing that because the River Nile flooded and covered the land with mud, geometry was needed to mark out people's land "with lines and measures". Isidore distinguishes astronomy from astrology and covers the world, the sky and the celestial sphere, the zodiac, the sun, moon, stars, Milky Way, and planets, and the names of the stars. He derives the curved (curvus) vault of the heavens from the Latin word for "upside-down" (conversus). He explains eclipses of the sun as the moon coming between the earth and the sun and eclipses of the moon as happening when it runs into the shadow of the earth. He condemns the Roman naming of the planets after their gods: Jupiter, Saturn, Mars, Venus, and Mercury. Isidore of Seiville distinguished between a 'Superstitious' astrology (in Latin: astrologia superstitiosa) from a 'Natural' astrology. The first deals with the horoscope and the attempt of foreseeing the future of one or more persons; the latter was a legitimate activity which had concerns with meteorological predictions, including iatromathematics and astrological medicine.

Book IV covers medicine, including the four humours, diseases, remedies and medical instruments. He derives the word medicine from the Latin for "moderation" (modus), and "sciatica" (sciasis) from the affected part of the body, the hip (Greek ἰσχία "ischia").

Book V covers law and chronology. Isidore distinguishes natural, civil, international, military and public law among others. He discusses the purpose of law, legal cases, witnesses, offences and penalties. On chronology, Isidore covers periods of time such as days, weeks, and months, solstices and equinoxes, seasons, special years such as Olympiads and Jubilees, generations and ages.

In Book VI, Isidore describes ecclesiastical books and offices starting with the Old and New Testaments, the authors and names of the holy books, libraries and translators, authors, writing materials including tablets, papyrus and parchment, books, scribes, and Christian festivals.

Book VII describes the basic scheme concerning God, angels and saints, in other words the hierarchies of heaven and earth, from patriarchs, prophets and apostles down the scale through people named in the gospels to martyrs, clergymen, monks and ordinary Christians.

Book VIII covers religion in the shape of the Roman Catholic Church, the Jews and heretical sects, philosophers (pagans) including poets, sibyls and magi, and the pagan gods.

Book IX covers languages, peoples, kingdoms, cities and titles.

Book X is a word-list of nouns and adjectives, together with supposed etymologies for them. For example, the letter 'D' begins with the word for master (Dominus), as he is the head of a household (Domus); the adjective docile (docilis) is derived by Isidore from the verb for "to teach" (docere), because docile people are able to learn; and the word for abominable (Nefarius) is explained as being not worth the grain called spelt (Far).

Book XI covers human beings, portents and transformations. Isidore derives human beings (homo) from the Latin for soil (humus), as in Genesis 2:7 it says that man is made from the soil. Urine (urina) gets its name either from the fact that it can burn (urere) the skin or, Isidore hedges, that it is from the kidneys (renes). Femina, meaning woman, comes from femora/femina meaning thighs, as this part of the body shows she is not a man. The Latin for buttocks is clunis as they are near the large intestine or colon (colum).

Book XII covers animals, including small animals, snakes, worms, fish, birds and other beasts that fly. Isidore's treatment is as usual full of conjectural etymology, so a horse is called equus because when in a team of four horses they are balanced (aequare). The spider (aranea) is so called from the air (aer) that feeds it. The electric ray (torpedo) is called that because it numbs (torpescere, like "torpid") anyone who touches it.

Book XIII describes the physical world, atoms, classical elements, the sky, clouds, thunder and lightning, rainbows, winds, and waters including the sea, the Mediterranean, bays, tides, lakes, rivers and floods. The sky is called caelum as it has stars stamped on to it, like a decorated pot (caelatus). Clouds are called nubes as they veil (obnubere) the sky, just as brides (nupta) wear veils for their weddings. The wind is called ventus in Latin as it is angry and violent (vehemens, violentus). There are many kinds of water: some water "is salty, some alkaline, some with alum, some sulfuric, some tarry, and some containing a cure for illnesses." There are waters that cure eye injuries, or make voices melodious, or cause madness, or cure infertility. The water of the Styx causes immediate death.

Book XIV covers geography, describing the Earth, islands, promontories, mountains and caves. The earth is divided into three parts, Asia occupying half the globe, and Europe and Africa each occupying a quarter. Europe is separated from Africa by the Mediterranean, reaching in from the Ocean that flows all around the land. Isidore writes that the orbis of the earth, translated by Barney as "globe", "derives its name from the roundness of the circle, because it resembles a wheel; hence a small wheel is called a 'small disk' (orbiculus)". Barney notes that orbis "refers to the 'circle' of lands around the Mediterranean, and hence to the total known extent of land." Isidore illustrated the Etymologies with a circular T-O map which also gave a vague impression of a flat disc-shaped Earth, though authors disagree about Isidore's beliefs on the matter.

Book XV covers cities and buildings including public buildings, houses, storehouses and workshops, parts of buildings, tents, fields and roads.

Book XVI covers metals and rocks, starting with dust and earth, and moving on to gemstones of different colours, glass and mines. Metals include gold, silver, copper, iron, lead and electrum. Weights and measures end the book. Games with boards and dice are described.

Book XVII describes agriculture including grains, legumes, vines, trees, aromatic herbs and vegetables.

Book XVIII covers the terms of war, games and jurisprudence. Isidore describes standards, trumpets, weapons including swords, spears, arrows, slings, battering rams, and armour including shields, breastplates and helmets. Athletic games include running and jumping, throwing and wrestling. Circus games are described, with chariot racing, horse racing and vaulting. In the theatre, comedy, tragedy, mime and dance are covered. In the amphitheatre, Isidore covers those who fight with nets, nooses and other weapons.

Book XIX covers ships including boats, sails, ropes and nets; forges and tools; building, including walls, decorations, ceilings, mosaics, statues, and building tools; and clothes, including types of dress, cloaks, bedding, tools, rings, belts and shoes. The word "net" (rete), is derived from retaining (retinere) fish, or perhaps, writes Isidore, from the ropes (restis) they are attached to.

Book XX completes Isidore's encyclopaedia, describing food and drink and vessels for these, storage and cooking vessels; furnishings including beds and chairs; vehicles, farm and garden tools and equipment for horses.

Reception

Medieval to Renaissance

Isidore was widely influential throughout the Middle Ages, feeding directly into word lists and encyclopaedias by Papias, Huguccio, Bartholomaeus Anglicus and Vincent of Beauvais, as well as being used everywhere in the form of small snippets. His influence also pertained to early medieval riddle collections such as the Bern Riddles or the Aenigmata of Aldhelm. He was cited by Dante Alighieri, quoted by Geoffrey Chaucer, and his name was mentioned by the poets Boccaccio, Petrarch and John Gower among others. Dante went so far as to place Isidore in Paradise in the final part of his Divine Comedy, Paradiso (10.130–131).

Through the Middle Ages Etymologiae was the textbook most in use, regarded so highly as a repository of classical learning that, in a great measure, it superseded the use of the individual works of the classics themselves, full texts of which were no longer copied and thus were lost. It was one of the most popular compendia in medieval libraries.

Modern

"An editor's enthusiasm is soon chilled by the discovery that Isidore's book is really a mosaic of pieces borrowed from previous writers, sacred and profane, often their 'ipsa verba' without alteration," Wallace Lindsay noted in 1911, having recently edited Isidore for the Clarendon Press, with the further observation, however, that a portion of the texts quoted have otherwise been lost: the Prata of Suetonius, for instance, can only be reconstructed from Isidore's excerpts.

In the view of John T. Hamilton, writing in The Classical Tradition in 2010, "Our knowledge of ancient and early medieval thought owes an enormous amount to this encyclopedia, a reflective catalogue of received wisdom, which the authors of the only complete translation into English introduce as "arguably the most influential book, after the Bible, in the learned world of the Latin West for nearly a thousand years" These days, of course, Isidore and his Etymologies are anything but household names... but the Vatican has named Isidore the patron saint of the Internet, which is likely to make his work slightly better known.

Ralph Hexter, also writing in The Classical Tradition, comments on "Isidore's largest and massively influential work... on which he was still at work at the time of his death... his own architecture for the whole is relatively clear (if somewhat arbitrary)... At the deepest level Isidore's encyclopedia is rooted in the dream that language can capture the universe and that if we but parse it correctly, it can lead us to the proper understanding of God's creation. His word derivations are not based on principles of historical linguistics but follow their own logic... Isidore is the master of bricolage... His reductions and compilations did indeed transmit ancient learning, but Isidore, who often relied on scholia and earlier compilations, is often simplistic scientifically and philosophically, especially compared to .. figures such as Ambrose and Augustine."

Peter Jones, writing in The Daily Telegraph, compares The Etymologies to the Internet:

Manuscripts and printed editions

Almost 1000 manuscript copies of Etymologiae have survived. The earliest is held at the St. Gall Abbey library, Switzerland, in the Codex Sangallensis: it is a 9th-century copy of books XI to XX. The 13th-century Codex Gigas, the largest extant medieval manuscript, now held in the National Library of Sweden, contains a copy of the Etymologiae.

In 1472 at Augsburg, Etymologiae became one of the first books to be printed, quickly followed by ten more editions by 1500. Juan de Grial produced the first scholarly edition in Madrid in 1599. Faustino Arevalo included it as two of the 17 volumes of his Opera omnia in Rome (1797–1803).  Rudolph Beer produced a facsimile edition of the Toledo manuscript of the Etymologies in 1909.  Wallace Lindsay edited the first modern critical edition in 1911.  Jacques Fontaine and Manuel C. Diaz y Diaz have between 1981 and 1995 supervised the production of the first five volumes of the Etymologies in the Belle Lettres series "Auteurs Latins du Moyen Age", with extensive footnotes.

Notes

References

Bibliography

External links 

 Summary of contents in English (starts on page 57)
 Codex Guelferbytanus 64 Weissenburgensis (Herzog August Bibliothek)
 Scholia in Isidori Etymologias Vallicelliana

 Latin texts
 from LacusCurtius
 from the Latin Library
 from IntraText

7th-century Latin books
Latin encyclopedias
Spanish encyclopedias
Medieval European encyclopedias